Telecom Enforcement Resource and Monitoring (TERM), formerly known as Vigilance Telecom Monitoring (VTM), is the vigilance and monitoring wing of the Indian Department of Telecommunications (DoT). TERM is made up of 34 Cells in India's 22 telecom circles and 10 large telecom districts, each headed by a Senior Administrative Grade (SAG) level officer, termed as Deputy Director General (DDG). The main functions of TERM Cells are vigilance, monitoring and security of the network. Apart from this, TERM Cells also operate the Central Monitoring System (CMS), a clandestine mass electronic surveillance program, and carry out other functions. The TERM Cells function as the subordinate offices of the DoT in the field. These Cells represent the Telegraph Authority and the Licensor.

History
Vigilance Telecom Monitoring Cells (VTM) were created by the Government to control illegal/clandestine telecom operations. Three VTM Cells were set up in October 2004 at Delhi, Mumbai and Hyderabad, and a fourth cell was created at Chennai the following month. Cells were added at Gujarat, Karnataka, Kerala, Maharashtra, Punjab, Rajasthan, Tamil Nadu, Uttar Pradesh (East), and West Bengal in August 2006, and at Andaman and Nicobar, Andhra Pradesh, Assam, Bihar, Chhattisgarh, Haryana, Himachal Pradesh, Jammu and Kashmir, Jharkhand, Madhya Pradesh, North East-I, North East-II, Orissa, Uttarakhand, and Uttar Pradesh (West) in January 2007. Cells were added in March 2007 for Ahmedabad, Bangalore, Jaipur, Kolkata, Lucknow and Pune, taking the total number of VTM Cells to 34.

VTM Cells were renamed to Telecom Enforcement Resource and Monitoring (TERM) Cells, with effect from 5 August 2008. The Government felt that the new name reflected "the entire gamut of functions assigned to the Cells" and "distinguished their role vis-vis staff-vigilance activities".

Functions
TERM Cells analyze and resolve complaints received through the Public Grievance (PG) portal or from other sources. TERM Cells were given the task of checking the compliance of EMF radiation norms, as prescribed by Government, in 2010. TERM Cells collect a fee from operators for carrying out EMF testing. Other functions of TERM Cells are checking mobile spectrum utilization and investigation of complaints regarding telecom and Internet services.

Registration of OSPs
Due to the growth of the business process outsourcing (BPO) industry in India, the DoT decided to decentralize the registration of Other Service Providers (OSPs), which was being done by the DoT, HQ. The job of registering OSPs and telemarketers was given to TERM Cells. The task of registering telemarketers was later given to the Telecom Regulatory Authority of India (TRAI). OSP registrations are done using software developed with the help of the National Informatics Centre (NIC). The website for OSP registration is http://dotosp.gov.in.

Service testing
TERM Cells were given the task of service testing of licensed TSPs in the licensed service area and checking their roll-out obligations as per the license conditions. As per the license agreement, all the TSPs are required to roll out their services within prescribed time periods, which means they have to offer their services in the districts selected by them by a fixed date. This then crosschecked for quality, coverage and other parameters by the DoT which is termed as Service Testing. TERM Cells also issue Service Test Result Certificates (STRCs) against the cases tested by them. Apart from this TERM Cells also send compiled data pertaining to roll out obligation for imposing Liquidated Damage (LD) charges on the TSPs do not comply with roll-out obligation conditions. TERM Cells collect a fee from operators for carrying out testing.

Central Monitoring System

The Central Monitoring System (CMS) is a clandestine mass electronic surveillance program installed by the Centre for Development of Telematics (C-DOT), an Indian Government owned telecommunications technology development centre, and operated by TERM Cells. The CMS gives India's security agencies and income tax officials centralized access to India's telecommunications network and the ability to listen in on and record mobile, landline and satellite calls and voice over Internet Protocol (VoIP), and read private emails, SMS and MMS, geolocate people using Mobile phone tracking, all in real time. It can also monitor posts on social media and Google searches, without any parliamentary or judicial oversight.

List of TERM Cells
There are currently 34 TERM Cells in India's 24 telecom circles and 10 large telecom districts. Each cell is headed by a Senior Administrative Grade (SAG) level officer,
termed as Deputy Director General (DDG).

See also
National Technical Research Organisation, India's technical intelligence agency.
NETRA, a mass surveillance, internet traffic analysis system.
NATGRID, the Indian national intelligence grid.
Mass surveillance in India
Ministry of Communications and Information Technology

References

Ministry of Communications and Information Technology (India)
2004 establishments in India
Telecommunications authorities of India
Privacy of telecommunications
Cyber Security in India